Liselotte Grschebina (or Grjebina; 1908–1994) was an Israeli photographer.

Biography

Early life and education
Liselotte Grschebina was born Liselotte Billigheimer in 1908 in Karlsruhe, Germany. Her parents were Rosa and Otto Billigheimer, a Jewish couple. Her father was killed in 1916 while serving in the German army. In 1925–29 Grschebina studied painting and graphic design at the local art academy, Badische Landeskunstschule Karlsruhe (BLK) and studied commercial photography at the School of Applied Arts in Stuttgart.

Beginnings in Germany
In 1929 Grschebina began to teach photography in the advertising course, Badische Landeskunstschule Karlsruhe (BLK). In January 1932 she opens Bilfoto, her own studio, announcing her specialisation in child photography, and takes on students. In 1933, following the Nazis come to power and the restrictions on professional freedom for Jews, Grschebina closed her studio. Before leaving Germany, she marries Dr. Jacob (Jasha) Grschebin.

Mandate Palestine and Israel
The Grschebin couple reaches Tel Aviv in March 1934. The same year, Grschebina opens the Ishon studio on Allenby Street with her friend Ellen Rosenberg (Auerbach), previously a partner in the Berlin photographic studio ringl + pit. In 1936 the Ishon studio is closed when Rosenberg leaves the country; Grschebina continues to work from her home.

In 1934–47 Grschebina is appointed the official photographer for the Zionist women's organization WIZO. In 1939, together with fellow photographers of German origin gathered in Tel Aviv, establishes the Palestine Professional Photographers Association (PPPA), the first independent photographers organisation in the country. Between the 1930s to 1950s Grschebina takes photographs for Palestine Railways, the large dairy company Tnuva, kibbutzim, and various private businesses.

Liselotte Grschebina died in Petah Tikva at the age of 86, on June 14, 1994.

Style
Grschebina arrived in Palestine in 1934, a trained professional profoundly influenced by the revolutionary movements of the Weimar Republic: New Objectivity in painting and New Vision in photography, as well as by a number of prominent professors, including Karl Hubbuch and :de:Wilhelm Schnarrenberger. Unlike many of her colleagues in Palestine, who sought their identities in the collective Zionist endeavor by documenting and extolling it in their work, Grschebina did not use photography as a means of forming her identity. She came with a full-fledged style and remained committed to Weimar artistic ideals and principles in her new home, where she continued to apply and develop them. This exhibition premieres a major selection from among the 1,800 photographs that were given to the Israel Museum and unveils her life and work to the public for the first time. Grschebina's artistic roots clearly lay in New Vision, which defined photography as an artistic field in its own right and called on camera artists to portray subjects in a new, different way to convey their unique qualities and their essence. She did this through striking vantage points and strong diagonals, making masterful use of mirrors, reflections, and plays of light and shadow to create geometric shapes and to endow her photographs with atmosphere, appeal, and meaning.

In Germany, most of her photographs – usually advertising commissions – were taken in the studio. In the land of Israel, she also worked outdoors, observing those around her with a clear, impartial eye. She photographed people going about their daily routine, unaffected by the presence of the camera. The viewer of her pictures feels like an outsider looking in, gaining a new, objective perspective on the subject: the "objective portrait . . . not encumbered with subjective intention" wherein, according to New Vision photographer László Moholy-Nagy, lies the genius of photography.

Legacy
The photographs of Liselotte Grschebina, rediscovered casually, almost miraculously, in a cupboard in Tel Aviv, reveal a talent that might otherwise have remained forgotten.

The archive of Liselotte Grschebina's photographs were given to the Israel Museum by her son, Beni Gjebin and his wife Rina, from Shoham, with the assistance of Rachel and Dov Gottesman, the museum president between 2001 and 2011.

Gallery

Exhibitions
 1937 – Takes part in an international exhibition in Paris
 1938 – Takes part in the group exhibition "Old Life – New Life" by photogroup T’munah (Hebrew for picture) from the Berlin Zionist Association (BZV) shown at their site in Kantstraße
 1941 – Takes part in the PPPA's group exhibition held in Logos, a Tel Aviv bookshop rearranged as gallery space
 2000, Summer – Time Frame: A Century of Photography in the Land of Israel, Israel Museum, Jerusalem
 2005 – The New Hebrews – 100 Years of Israeli Art, Martin-Gropius-Bau, Berlin
 2008, October–December – Woman with a Camera: Liselotte Grschebina, Germany 1908 – Israel 1994, Ticho House
 2009 – Eine Frau Mit Kamera: Liselotte Grschebina, Deutschland 1908 – 1994 Israel. Eine Ausstellung des Israel Museums, Jerusalem. Curator: Yudit Caplan, Martin-Gropius-Bau, Berlin

References

External links 
 
 
 

1908 births
1994 deaths
20th-century Israeli women artists
20th-century women photographers
Photographers from Baden-Württemberg
Israeli photographers
German women photographers
Israeli women photographers
Artists from Karlsruhe
Jewish emigrants from Nazi Germany to Mandatory Palestine
Early photographers in Palestine